The Arrondissement of Chaumont is an arrondissement of France in the Haute-Marne department, Grand Est Region. It has 158 communes.

Composition

The communes of the arrondissement of Chaumont are:

Ageville
Aillianville
Aizanville
Andelot-Blancheville
Annéville-la-Prairie
Arc-en-Barrois
Aubepierre-sur-Aube
Audeloncourt
Autreville-sur-la-Renne
Bassoncourt
Biesles
Blaisy
Blessonville
Bologne
Bourdons-sur-Rognon
Bourg-Sainte-Marie
Bourmont-entre-Meuse-et-Mouzon
Brainville-sur-Meuse
Braux-le-Châtel
Brethenay
Breuvannes-en-Bassigny
Briaucourt
Bricon
Bugnières
Busson
Buxières-lès-Clefmont
Buxières-lès-Villiers
Chalvraines
Chamarandes-Choignes
Chambroncourt
Champigneulles-en-Bassigny
Chantraines
Châteauvillain
Chaumont
Chaumont-la-Ville
Choiseul
Cirey-lès-Mareilles
Cirfontaines-en-Azois
Clefmont
Clinchamp
Colombey-les-Deux-Églises
Condes
Consigny
Coupray
Cour-l'Évêque
Curmont
Cuves
Daillancourt
Daillecourt
Dancevoir
Darmannes
Dinteville
Doncourt-sur-Meuse
Ecot-la-Combe
Esnouveaux
Euffigneix
Forcey
Foulain
Froncles
La Genevroye
Germainvilliers
Giey-sur-Aujon
Gillancourt
Graffigny-Chemin
Guindrecourt-sur-Blaise
Hâcourt
Harréville-les-Chanteurs
Huilliécourt
Humberville
Illoud
Is-en-Bassigny
Jonchery
Juzennecourt
Lachapelle-en-Blaisy
Lafauche
Laferté-sur-Aube
Lamancine
Lanques-sur-Rognon
Lanty-sur-Aube
Latrecey-Ormoy-sur-Aube
Laville-aux-Bois
Lavilleneuve-au-Roi
Leffonds
Leurville
Levécourt
Liffol-le-Petit
Longchamp
Louvières
Luzy-sur-Marne
Maisoncelles
Malaincourt-sur-Meuse
Mandres-la-Côte
Manois
Maranville
Marbéville
Mareilles
Marnay-sur-Marne
Mennouveaux
Merrey
Meures
Millières
Mirbel
Montheries
Montot-sur-Rognon
Morionvilliers
Neuilly-sur-Suize
Ninville
Nogent
Noyers
Orges
Ormoy-lès-Sexfontaines
Orquevaux
Oudincourt
Outremécourt
Ozières
Perrusse
Poinson-lès-Nogent
Pont-la-Ville
Poulangy
Prez-sous-Lafauche
Rangecourt
Rennepont
Reynel
Riaucourt
Richebourg
Rimaucourt
Rizaucourt-Buchey
Rochefort-sur-la-Côte
Romain-sur-Meuse
Saint-Blin
Saint-Thiébault
Sarcey
Semilly
Semoutiers-Montsaon
Sexfontaines
Signéville
Silvarouvres
Sommerécourt
Soncourt-sur-Marne
Soulaucourt-sur-Mouzon
Thivet
Thol-lès-Millières
Treix
Vaudrecourt
Vaudrémont
Verbiesles
Vesaignes-sous-Lafauche
Vesaignes-sur-Marne
Viéville
Vignes-la-Côte
Vignory
Villars-en-Azois
Villiers-le-Sec
Villiers-sur-Suize
Vitry-lès-Nogent
Vouécourt
Vraincourt
Vroncourt-la-Côte

History

The arrondissement of Chaumont was created in 1800.

As a result of the reorganisation of the cantons of France which came into effect in 2015, the borders of the cantons are no longer related to the borders of the arrondissements. The cantons of the arrondissement of Chaumont were, as of January 2015:

 Andelot-Blancheville
 Arc-en-Barrois
 Bourmont
 Châteauvillain
 Chaumont-Nord
 Chaumont-Sud
 Clefmont
 Juzennecourt
 Nogent
 Saint-Blin
 Vignory

References

Chaumont